Andi Qani Xhixha (born 15 April 1991) is an Albanian footballer who most recently played as a goalkeeper for Burreli in the Albanian First Division.

References

External links
 FSHF Profile

1991 births
Living people
Footballers from Durrës
Albanian footballers
Association football goalkeepers
KS Burreli players
KF Apolonia Fier players
KF Adriatiku Mamurrasi players
KF Teuta Durrës players
FK Tomori Berat players
Kategoria Superiore players
Kategoria e Parë players